White Hunter is a 1957 British TV series. It starred Rhodes Reason and Harry Baird ran for 39 episodes.

It was based on the book White Hunter by J. A. Hunter.

Several episodes star Hugh Moxey as Purley.

It was Produced by Norman Williams (producer), husband of Patricia Dainton.

Some episodes were edited together as the feature Man Eater.

References

External links
White Hunter at IMDb
White Hunter at CTVA
Man Eater at IMDb
Man Eater at BFI

1957 British television series debuts